Mesqan (also Mäsqan or Meskan) is an Afro-Asiatic language spoken by the Gurage people in the Gurage Zone of Ethiopia. It belongs to the family's Ethiopian Semitic branch.

Phonology

Consonants 

 /k, ɡ/ can also be heard as palatalized [kʲ, ɡʲ].

Vowels

References

Languages of Ethiopia
Outer Ethiopian Semitic languages